Khed/Kher is a village in Barmer district , of Rajasthan, India. It is 9 km from Balotra and situated on Baytu-Balotra Road.

Villages in Barmer district